95th Infantry Division may refer to:
 95th Infantry Division (German Empire)
 95th Infantry Division (United States)
 95th Infantry Division (Wehrmacht)